is a Prefectural Natural Park in Tokyo, Japan. The park was established in 1953.

See also
 National Parks of Japan
 Parks and gardens in Tokyo

References

Parks and gardens in Tokyo
Protected areas established in 1953
1953 establishments in Japan

fr:Parc naturel préfectoral Akikawa Kyūryō